Sanda Wimala II,  whose personal name was Poe Shwe (ပိုးရွှေ), was a king of the Mrauk-U Dynasty of Arakan.

Early life

Poe Shwe was originally a minister under Sanda Thumana. The king was seen as a tyrant and many rebellions occurred under his reign; eventually, in April 1777, Poe Shwe joined the rebels.

The king sent his general and brother-in-law Ananta Thirikyawhtin, along with the royal army, to subdue the rebellion. They set up camp at Kantha Yekyaw, where the rebels attacked them. The general was severely wounded and retreated to Mrauk U, dying four days later of his wounds. Sanda Thumana fled from the palace when word of the defeat reached him.

Reign

The next day, the rebels occupied the capital and Poe Shwe took the throne, assuming the title Sanda Wimala II. Forty days later, Aung Son of Ramree Island arrived with an army to conquer Mrauk U. Sanda Wimala II was defeated in his turn and fled to Shite-thaung Temple. Aung Son took the throne as Sanda Thaditha, later forcing Sanda Wimala II to become a monk. The former king is not mentioned again in the Arakanese chronicles and his date of death is unknown.

References

Bibliography
 
 
 
 

Wimala
Wimala 2
Wimala 2